General Executive Agency of Court Decision (GEACD) is an agency of the government of Mongolia. It serves as that country's prison service.

References

External links
 General Executive Agency of Court Decision
 General Executive Agency of Court Decision 

Prison and correctional agencies
Government agencies of Mongolia
Law enforcement in Mongolia